Bonnet Lake or Lake Bonnet is a  natural freshwater lake in Highlands County, Florida.  It is bounded on the north by Lake Bonnet Village, on its west by Bonnet Lake Campgrounds, on its southwest by a railroad line and on its south and southeast by Highlands Ridge.  On part of its north shore is a citrus grove.  To the lake's northeast is a large wooded area.  Lake Bonnet Village and Bonnet Lake Campgrounds are mobile home and recreational vehicle parks for residents aged 55 and greater.  Highlands Village is a retirement housing development.

The lake was so named for the abundance of a water flower called "bonnets".

Boating and fishing information
A boat ramp on the north side of the lake is in the middle of Lake Bonnet Village.  It may be used by anyone who pays the fee collected at the Village administrative building up the hill from the lake.  There are no other boat ramps that can be used by the public.  There are no public swimming areas on the lake shore.  Bonnet Lake may be fished.  The HookandBullet.Com website says the lake contains bluegill, gar and blue catfish.

Islands of lake
Most of the small natural lakes in the area have no or very few islands in them. Bonnet Lake has five islands, none of which have structures on them. All are small or very small. Two are located just off the shore of Lake Bonnet Village. It is in front of the  entrance to a canal. The other island off the Village is between the boat ramp and a private boat dock west of the ramp.

Two of the islands are just off the shore of Bonnet Lake Campgrounds.

References

Lakes of Highlands County, Florida
Lakes of Florida